Nicholas Piantedosi (born November 8, 1984), professionally known as Decap, is an American record producer from Nashua, New Hampshire, United States.  Decap has worked with and produced for artists such as Talib Kweli, Joyner Lucas, Hit-Boy, Locksmith, Zion I, Spose, Watsky, Smoke DZA,  J-Essential and many more. In 2013, Decap released his full length debut instrumental album, Omni Love.

Early life 

Nicholas Piantedosi was born in Waltham, Massachusetts and relocated to Nashua, New Hampshire as a young child. As early as Junior High School, Decap was fascinated with music and began to study the art of producing. In 1995, after purchasing Snoop Dogg “Doggystyle” album, Decap was fully committed to making his presence felt in hip-hop. Decap began to collect and study the genre and drew inspiration from hip-hop pioneers such as J Dilla, Dj Premier, Pete Rock, and  A Tribe Called Quest. Decap began rapping and started a 9 member rap group named, “Young Tribe.”  Inspired by marginal success and wanting original material for Young Tribe, Decap bought his first drum machine and began to record beats and instrumentals.

Music career

In 2007, Decap moved to New York City, New York to pursue his career in music. In January 2013, Decap relocated to San Francisco, California and began work on his solo album, “Omni Love”. Decap produced and mixed several tracks on the Talib Kweli album, “Gravitas”. In June 2015, Decap released the single, “Feeling”, which reached 550,000 streams on Spotify and led to a collaborative performance video with Ableton. Also in 2015, Decap produced several tracks on the Spose album, “Why Am I So Happy” which peaked at number 1 on Billboard charts.

In July 2016, Decap produced a non-album single alongside Teeko (producer) THRPY (producer) and AzizTheShake (rapper). The song, titled "Hot Box", charted at #6 on Billboard, and #6 on Spotify USA Viral 50 Charts. Also In 2016, Decap founded the label/collective "Future Knock". Beyond a label, Decap considers "Future Knock" a new subgenre with its own signature sound. Decap also curates a bi-weekly “Future Knock” podcast promoting up-and-coming artist and producers. Decap released his Drums That Knock downloadable sound kit series (volumes 1-10) for electronic producers, which received 180,000 downloads and charted at #1 on Splice for the month of December 2016. In April 2017, Decap produced the single “In The Bay” by Capitol Fr artist Ted Park.

Discography

Studio albums

Singles

Production discography

Singles produced

References

External links 

1984 births
Living people
American hip hop record producers
Musicians from Massachusetts
Musicians from San Francisco
Record producers from California